Yakima School District No. 7 is a public school district in Yakima County, Washington, USA and serves the city of Yakima.

As of May 2016, the district had an enrollment of 15,999 students. The student body was over three-quarters Latino in 2016. Four Latinos have been elected to the Yakima School Board since 1999.

Schools

High schools
A. C. Davis High School
D. D. Eisenhower High School
Stanton Academy
Yakima Online
Yakima Valley Technical Skills Center

Middle schools
Discovery Lab
Franklin Middle School
Lewis and Clark Middle School
Washington Middle School
Wilson Middle School

Primary schools
Adams Elementary
Barge Lincoln Elementary
Discovery Lab
Garfield Elementary
Gilbert Elementary
Hoover Elementary
M. L. King Jr. Elementary
McClure Elementary
McKinley Elementary
Nob Hill Elementary
Ridgeview Elementary
Robertson Elementary
Roosevelt Elementary
Whitney Elementary

References

External links

Yakima School District Report Card

School districts in Washington (state)
Education in Yakima County, Washington